The 1902 Iowa Hawkeyes football team represented the University of Iowa in the 1902 Western Conference football season. This season was Alden Knipe's fifth and final as head coach of the Hawkeyes.

Schedule

References

Iowa
Iowa Hawkeyes football seasons
Iowa Hawkeyes football